Kachal Daraq (also known as Kachal Z̄araq and Kegalyar) is a village in Sanjabad-e Jonubi Rural District, Firuz District, Kowsar County, Ardabil Province, Iran. At the 2006 census, its population was 25, in 5 families.

References 

Towns and villages in Kowsar County